Memorial Beach is the fifth studio album by the Norwegian band A-ha, released on 14 June 1993 by Warner Bros. Records.

Background
The album was recorded primarily at Prince's Paisley Park studios outside Minneapolis in the United States. Memorial Beach featured three UK Top 50 singles for the band, "Move to Memphis" (released as a single in 1991, almost two years before the album), "Dark is the Night" and "Angel in the Snow". While the album did not chart on the U.S. Billboard 200 and would be the band's last to be released there, the single "Dark Is the Night" peaked at #11 on the Billboard Bubbling Under Hot 100 Singles chart, their last U.S. charting to date. Q magazine listed the album as one of the 50 best albums of 1993: "If ever a band deserved reappraisal on the back of an album then it was a-ha!"

"Angel in the Snow" was written by Pål Waaktaar for his bride, Lauren, as a wedding gift. Recording the album was, according to Morten Harket, "A rather dark and heavy period for the band", although Magne Furuholmen has said, "I dig Memorial Beach, and 'Dark is the Night for All' is the high point, the best thing on the disc."

JD and Jevetta Steele from the American gospel group The Steeles contribute backing vocals on the songs "Move to Memphis" and "Lie Down in Darkness". French actress Béatrice Dalle appears in the music video for the song "Move to Memphis".

Some lyrics from "Locust" were reused on the 2004 Savoy single "Whalebone".

This was the last album to feature the original a-ha logo until they reunited for the second time for Cast in Steel (2015).

Track listing
All tracks written by Pål Waaktaar unless noted otherwise:

 "Dark Is the Night for All" – 3:46
 "Move to Memphis" – 4:22 (Pål Waaktaar/Magne Furuholmen)
 "Cold as Stone" – 8:19
 "Angel in the Snow" – 4:13
 "Locust" – 5:09
 "Lie Down in Darkness" – 4:32
 "How Sweet It Was" – 6:00
 "Lamb to the Slaughter" – 4:20 (Magne Furuholmen)
 "Between Your Mama and Yourself" – 4:16
 "Memorial Beach" – 4:36

2015 Deluxe edition
Disc 1

 "Dark Is The Night For All"
 "Move To Memphis"
 "Cold As Stone"
 "Angel In The Snow"
 "Locust"
 "Lie Down In Darkness"
 "How Sweet It Was"
 "Lamb To The Slaughter"
 "Between Your Mama And Yourself"
 "Memorial Beach"

Bonus tracks

 "Move To Memphis" (Extended Mix)
 "Angel In The Snow" (Acoustic Instrumental)

Disc 2

 "Dark Is The Night For All" (Demo)
 "Cold As Stone" (Demo)
 "Angel In The Snow" (Demo)
 "Locust" (Demo)
 "Lie Down In Darkness" (Demo)
 "How Sweet It Was" (Demo)
 "Bar Room" (Demo)
 "Lamb To The Slaughter" (Demo)
 "Between Your Mama And Yourself" (Demo)
 "Memorial Beach" (Demo)
 "Dark Is The Night For All" (Alternative Version)
 "Swing Of Things" (Live March 17, 1994 at The Sentrum Scene/ Oslo, Norway)
 "Dark Is The Night For All" (Live March 17, 1994 at The Sentrum Scene/ Oslo, Norway)
 "Move To Memphis" (Live March 17, 1994 at The Sentrum Scene/ Oslo, Norway)
 "Cold As Stone/Sycamore Leaves" (Live March 17, 1994 at The Sentrum Scene/ Oslo, Norway)
 "Shapes That Go Together" (Live March 17, 1994 at The Sentrum Scene/ Oslo, Norway)

Personnel

a-ha 
 Morten Harket – lead vocals
 Magne Furuholmen – keyboards, backing vocals
 Pål Waaktaar – guitars, drum programming, backing vocals

Additional Musicians 
 Jørun B. Bøgeberg – bass guitar
 Per Hillestad – drums
 J.D. Steele – backing vocals (2, 6)
 Jevetta Steele – backing vocals (2, 6)
 Kathy Wilson – backing vocals (2, 6)

Production 
 A-ha – producers
 David Z – producer, engineer 
 David Friedlander – engineer 
 Sverre Henriksen – engineer 
 Brian Poer – engineer 
 Jamie Staub – engineer 
 Djinji Brown – second engineer 
 Mike Cyr – second engineer 
 Derek Davis – second engineer 
 Derek Duffy – second engineer 
 Robert Opsahl-Engen – second engineer 
 Eivind Skovdahl – second engineer 
 Rod Hui – mixing 
 Pål Waaktaar – mixing 
 Ted Jensen – mastering at Sterling Sound (New York City, NY)
 Lyn Bradley – art direction, design 
 Jeri Heiden – art direction, design 
 Per Fronth – original artwork 
 Just Loomis – photography 
 Terry Slater – management

Charts

References

1993 albums
A-ha albums
Warner Records albums